No. 143 Wing RCAF was a unit of the Royal Canadian Air Force which served with the Royal Air Force in Europe during the Second World War.

History

RAF Second Tactical Air Force was established on 1 June 1943. No. 143 Wing was established on 10 January 1944. It comprised No. 438 Squadron RCAF, No. 439 Squadron RCAF, and No. 440 Squadron RCAF. As a fighter-ground attack unit, its purpose was to support the Canadian and British troops of 21st Army Group.

On 5 June 1944 while at RAF Hurn as "No. 143 (RCAF) (Fighter) Wing RAF"

From 22/23 June 1944 to 30 August 1944 the wing was located at B.5 (FRESNE CAMILLE) (for two days only) and then Lantheuil (B.9), just south of Creully, before moving forward to keep up with the ground forces. 

The Typhoon aircraft has been painted by Robert Bailey, picturing F/Lt Harry Hardy, RCAF, flying the "Pulverizer 2".

Sqn Ldr Donald A. Brewster OBE was the Wing's Chief Technical Officer from April 1944 until the end of the war.

The wing disbanded on 26 August 1945.

Aircraft
Hawker Hurricane IV (November 1943 - May 1944)
Hawker Typhoon IB (January 1944 - August 1945)

See also
 List of Wings of the Royal Air Force

References

Citations

Bibliography

Units and formations of the Royal Canadian Air Force
RCAF 143
N
Military units and formations disestablished in 1945